Knoutsodonta bouvieri is a species of sea slug, a dorid nudibranch, a shell-less marine gastropod mollusc in the family Onchidorididae.

Distribution
This species was described from Carry-le-Rouet on the Mediterranean Sea coast of France. It is similar to Onchidoris depressa and has not been reported since the original description.

References

Onchidorididae
Gastropods described in 1919